Anne Russell may refer to:
 Anne Russell, Countess of Bedford (1615–1684), wealthy English noblewoman
 Anne Russell, Countess of Warwick (1548/49–1604), English noblewoman and lady-in-waiting
 Anne Russell, Duchess of Bedford (c. 1705–1762)
 Anne Russell (judge)
 Anne Russell (artist)

See also
 Annie Russell, British-American stage actress
 Anna Russell, English–Canadian singer and comedian